La acariciante voz de Flor Silvestre (English: The Caressive Voice) is a studio album by Mexican singer Flor Silvestre, released in 1965 by Musart Records.

Track listing
Side one

Side two

Personnel
 Mariachi México – accompaniment
 Mariachi Internacional – accompaniment
 Mariachi Los Mensajeros – accompaniment
 Trío Los Albinos – accompaniment

References

1965 albums
Spanish-language albums
Flor Silvestre albums
Musart Records albums